Trance Europe Experience is a 1994 album by Zeni Geva.

Track listing 
 "Death Blows" - 3:18
 "Interzona" - 2:53
 "Dead Sun Rising" - 3:04
 "Desire For Agony" - 2:49
 "Stigma" - 2:40
 "Whiteout" - 5:31
 "Love Bite" - 3:53
 "Autopsy Love" - 3:31
 "Autofuck" - 4:38

Recording Credits 
 Track 1-6 recorded by Ronal Trijber(NOB) at VPRO Audio-1 studio, Netherlands, Oct.13.1994
 Track 7-8 recorded live at DEMOCRAZY, Gent, Belgium, Sep.3.1994
 Track 9 recorded live at VERA, Groningen, Netherlands, Sep.1.1994

References

Zeni Geva albums
1994 live albums